Dawn FM is the fifth studio album by Canadian singer-songwriter the Weeknd. It was released on January 7, 2022, through XO and Republic Records. The album features narration by Jim Carrey, guest vocals from Tyler, the Creator and Lil Wayne, and spoken word appearances from Quincy Jones and Josh Safdie. As the album's executive producers, the Weeknd, Max Martin and Oneohtrix Point Never recruited a variety of other producers such as Oscar Holter, Calvin Harris and Swedish House Mafia.

The Weeknd described the album's concept as a state of purgatory—a journey towards the "light at the end of a tunnel", serving as a follow-up to his fourth studio album After Hours (2020). Musically, Dawn FM is an upbeat record containing dance-pop and synth-pop songs that are heavily inspired by the 1980s new wave, funk and electronic dance music styles. The album received widespread acclaim from music critics, who complimented its production and melodies.

Four singles—"Take My Breath", "Sacrifice", "Out of Time" and "Less than Zero"—supported the album, with "Take My Breath" peaking at number six on the US Billboard Hot 100. The Weeknd promoted Dawn FM with an Amazon Music event on the album release day, in which he served as a disc jockey and played the album to an audience. He also promoted the album with a television music special on Amazon Prime Video that featured live performances, theater and performance art for a "night out at the club". Dawn FM reached number one in over 10 countries, including Australia, Canada, Ireland, the Netherlands, New Zealand and the United Kingdom. It debuted at number two on the US Billboard 200 chart.

To further support both After Hours and Dawn FM, the Weeknd embarked on the After Hours til Dawn Tour. The tour began on July 14, 2022, in North America, and it is scheduled to further visit South America, Europe, Asia, the Middle East and Australia.

Background and release
On March 20, 2020, the Weeknd released his fourth studio album After Hours during the beginning of COVID-19 restrictions. It was a commercial success and received mostly positive reviews from music critics, some of whom named it his best work yet. Shortly after, the Weeknd began working on his next studio album; in an interview with Rolling Stone in September 2020, he stated that he "might have another album ready to go by the time this quarantine is over." The Weeknd later explained that he was originally working on an album inspired by the depressive state he was in during the COVID-19 pandemic, but scrapped the project because it was "emotionally detrimental" and began working on Dawn FM.

The Weeknd began to tease a new album in May 2021 in an interview with Variety, when he stated "if the last record is the After Hours of the night, then The Dawn is coming". He continued to tease the album with the tentative title, The Dawn, during his acceptance speeches at the 2021 Billboard Music Awards and the 2021 iHeartRadio Music Awards. On August 2, the Weeknd released a teaser on his social media accounts titled "The Dawn is Coming", which contained a snippet of a then-unreleased song. Later that day, in a partnership with NBC Sports and the 2020 Summer Olympics, he announced the album's lead single "Take My Breath", which was released on August 6. On October 4, 2021, during an episode of his Apple Music 1 radio show, Memento Mori, the Weeknd announced that the album was complete, and that he was waiting on a "couple characters that are key to the narrative." He then described the characters as "some people that are near and dear to me, some people that inspired my life as a child and some that inspire me now."

On January 1, 2022, the Weeknd teased a possible surprise release of the album in an Instagram post, which featured a screenshot of a text conversation he had with his best friend and creative director La Mar Taylor. After exchanging New Year's greetings, the Weeknd messaged that "Everything feels chaotic again. Music can heal and that feels more important than another album rollout. Let's just drop the whole thing and enjoy it with the people... XO." The next day, the Weeknd hinted at the album's arrival, tweeting "wake up at dawn tomorrow". On January 3, he announced the album's official title through a trailer video and announced that it would be released on January 7, 2022. He subsequently revealed the track listing through a second trailer on January 5. On January 11, the Weeknd announced an expanded edition of the album subtitled Alternate World including two remixes and previously released single "Moth to a Flame" with Swedish House Mafia. During its first week, Dawn FM was only available via digital music and streaming platforms; physical copies were shipped at later dates. Addressing the initial lack of physical copies, the Weeknd took to Twitter and wrote, "this doesn't matter to me. [W]hat matters is getting to experience the album together with the fans during these times."

Composition

Primarily a pop record, Dawn FM is rooted in dance-pop and synth-pop genres.  Recalling 1980s electronic bands such as Depeche Mode and Duran Duran, the album significantly incorporates new wave, funk, and EDM, alongside elements of disco, electropop, hip hop, city pop, soft rock, psychedelia, R&B, blues, boogie, electro, dubstep, drum and bass, and techno. Influences of Michael Jackson's Off the Wall (1979) and Thriller (1982) are also present in Dawn FM.

Concept and themes
Dawn FM incorporates a "psychedelic radio" aesthetic with existential themes, similar to American experimental record producer Oneohtrix Point Never's album Magic Oneohtrix Point Never (2020), which the Weeknd appeared on and executive produced under his formal name. The "103.5" station tag that the album strongly uses is a nod to the Toronto radio station Z103.5, who is known for their dance-heavy playlists. In an interview with Billboard on November 23, 2021, the Weeknd elaborated on these themes, saying:

Artwork
The standard album cover of Dawn FM is shot by Matilda Finn. It features a dramatically aged version of the Weeknd as an elderly bearded man in a dark background setting with a small ray of light shining behind the back of his shoulder. The collector's and limited editions of the album, listed on the Weeknd's online store, features four alternate Dawn FM covers designed by American artist Robert Beatty, who also designed the album cover for OPN's Magic Oneohtrix Point Never. The HMV, Target, and indie-exclusive alternate covers were also designed by Beatty.

Promotion

Singles
On August 6, 2021, the album's lead single, "Take My Breath", was released digitally on music stores and streaming services. The song peaked at number six on the US Billboard Hot 100 and reached the top ten in 21 other territories. Its music video was premiered alongside its release and was directed by Cliqua.

"Sacrifice" was released as the second official single in tandem with Dawn FM on January 7, 2022. Its music video was released on the same day, and was directed by Cliqua. Its storyline follows the plot previously established by the "Take My Breath" music video. The song was sent to contemporary hit radio in the United States on January 11, 2022.

"Out of Time" was released to American urban adult contemporary radio on January 25, 2022, as the third official single from the album. Its music video was released on April 5, 2022, and was directed by Cliqua.

"Less than Zero" was given a limited single release in France, with it being sent to contemporary hit radio on July 7, 2022, as the album's fourth single in the country.

Other songs
A music video for the album's second track "Gasoline" was released on January 11, 2022. It follows the story arc established by the previous visuals released in support of the album and was directed by Matilda Finn. The song was set to be sent to American contemporary hit radio as the album's third single on January 18, 2022; however its release was cancelled.

"I Heard You're Married", featuring Lil Wayne, was originally meant to be sent to American rhythmic contemporary radio as the album's third single on January 11, 2022, but its release as a single was indefinitely cancelled.

An animated music video for the album's third track "How Do I Make You Love Me?" was released on July 22, 2022. It was directed by Jocelyn Charles with some creative direction from Cliqua.

On January 7, 2023, a music video for the album's tenth track "Is There Someone Else?" was released, as part of the one-year anniversary of the album's release. It was directed by Cliqua.

103.5 Dawn FM livestream
On January 7, 2022, alongside the release of Dawn FM, the Weeknd hosted a live event with Amazon Music, in which he served as a disc jockey and played the entire album in front of a small crowd. The event was live-streamed on Twitch and was directed by Micah Bickham. The Weeknd wore old makeup and prosthetics during the event, similar to the prosthetics he donned on the Dawn FM album cover. Various different shots of the livestream were turned into lyric videos for the album. The whole livestream was uploaded to YouTube on January 12, 2022.

The Dawn FM Experience 
On February 21, 2022, the Weeknd announced The Dawn FM Experience, a television music special with Amazon Prime Video that premiered on February 26. The special was directed by Micah Bickham and features live performances, theater and performance art for a "night out at the club." A ten-track live EP composed of the songs the Weeknd performed during the special was made available to stream exclusively on Amazon Music. The Dawn FM Experience entered the UK Albums Chart in March 2022, peaking at number 92.

Tour

Originally set to only support After Hours, the Weeknd announced on October 18, 2021, that his upcoming seventh concert tour would be renamed as the After Hours til Dawn Tour to incorporate elements from Dawn FM.

Critical reception

Dawn FM was met with widespread acclaim from music critics. At Metacritic, which assigns a normalized rating out of 100 to reviews from professional publications, the album received an average score of 88, based on 24 reviews, indicating "universal acclaim". Aggregator AnyDecentMusic? gave it 8.4 out of 10, based on their assessment of the critical consensus.

Describing Dawn FM as a new peak for the Weeknd, Will Dukes of Rolling Stone praised the album for its "interstellar ambitions" and "enchanting music". Mikael Wood of the Los Angeles Times called it "the year's first great album", praising its production, melodies and vocals, while noting that Dawn FM is more positive and upbeat than his previous works. Andy Kellman of AllMusic praised the album, stating, "In the main, this is a space for Tesfaye to fully indulge his frantic romantic side as his co-conspirators whip up fluorescent throwback Euro-pop with muscle and nuance". Rhian Daly of NME said Dawn FM "feels like the first steps on a journey for the Weeknd to find peace with himself; perhaps next time we hear from him, he'll be fully embracing the light of day." Dani Blum from Pitchfork enjoyed and said the album conceptualizes "listening to a retro-pop radio station in purgatory", delivering the Weeknd's most "thoughtful, melodic, and revealing project" of his career. David Smyth of Evening Standard wrote the Weeknd reaches his "pop prime" on the album. Matt Mitchell of Paste opined that Dawn FM transcends "dynamic pop grandeur and flaunts accountability in the face of death".

Reviewing the album for Variety, Jem Aswad stated Dawn FM is "possibly the Weeknd's best and most fully realized album to date." Spin critic Bobby Olivier praised Max Martin for conferring a cohesive, "well-polished" production to the album, while still maintaining its "dexterity, punch and sex appeal." Roisin O'Connor of The Independent wrote the album is "a self-knowing contradiction to the Weeknd's past celebrations of impermanence via one-night stands and sleazy affairs." Writing for Clash, Alex Rigotti stated the album has "some pacing issues" and lacks "character and vivacity" of its predecessor, but nevertheless is a solid follow-up with "its dramatic instrumentation and refreshed view of the world." Fellow critic Tom Hull gave it a B+ and said that, while the singer's previous albums had been "increasingly sluggish", he has "found a beat here, and even his voice has brightened up."

Year-end lists

Industry awards

Commercial performance
In the United States, Dawn FM debuted at number two on the Billboard 200 with 148,000 album-equivalent units, calculated from 173.04 million on-demand streams and 14,000 pure album copies; it was blocked from the top spot by American rapper Gunna's DS4Ever, which debuted with an extra 2,300 units that week. Dawn FM marked the Weeknd's eighth top 10 entry and his first studio album since Kiss Land (2013) to debut at number two.

In the United Kingdom, Dawn FM debuted at number one on the UK Albums Chart with over 20,000 units, becoming the Weeknd's third number-one album. It is the first album released in 2022 to top the chart.

Track listing

Notes
  signifies a co-producer
  signifies an additional producer

Sample credits
  "Sacrifice" contains an interpolation from "I Want to Thank You", written by Kevin McCord, and performed by Alicia Myers.
  "Out of Time" contains a sample from "Midnight Pretenders", written by Tomoko Aran and Tetsurō Oda, and performed by Aran.

Personnel
Credits adapted from liner notes.

Musicians

 The Weeknd – vocals, keyboards, programming (all tracks); bass, drums (4); background vocals (15)
 OPN – keyboards, programming (1–3, 7, 10–13, 16)
 Jasper Randall – choir arrangement (1, 11, 12)
 Angela Parrish – choir vocals (1, 11, 12)
 Anna Davidson – choir vocals (1, 11, 12)
 Bri Holland – choir vocals (1, 11, 12)
 Jessica Rotter – choir vocals (1, 11, 12)
 Joanna Wallfisch – choir vocals (1, 11, 12)
 Katie Hampton – choir vocals (1, 11, 12)
 Rachel Panchal – choir vocals (1, 11, 12)
 Sara Mann – choir vocals (1, 11, 12)
 Sarah Margaret Huff – choir vocals (1, 11, 12)
 Jim Carrey – voice (1, 7, 16)
 Max Martin – keyboards, programming (2–7, 10, 11, 13, 15, 16); bass (4, 15), drums (4); background vocals, guitar (15)
 Oscar Holter – keyboards, programming (2–7, 10, 11, 13, 15, 16); bass (4, 15), drums (4), guitar (15)
 Elvira Anderfjärd – background vocals (4)
 David Bukovinszky – cello (4, 11)
 Shellback – drums (4)
 Magnus Sjölander – percussion (4)
 Mattias Bylund – strings (4, 11)
 Mattias Johansson – violin (4, 11)
 Quincy Jones – voice (6)
 Christian Love – background vocals (8)
 Benny Bock – keyboards, programming (8)
 Brian Kennedy – keyboards, programming (8)
 Bruce Johnston – keyboards, programming, vocal arrangement, vocals (8)
 Charlie Coffeen – keyboards, programming (8)
 Rex Kudo – keyboards, programming (8)
 DaHeala – keyboards, programming (9)
 Peter Noos Johansson – trombone (11)
 Josh Safdie – voice (12)
 Calvin Harris – keyboards, programming (14)
 Matt Cohn – keyboards (16), programming (2, 3, 9, 12, 13), vocal arrangement (3, 16); drums (2, 3, 12, 13)

Technical
 Dave Kutch – mastering
 Şerban Ghenea – mixing
 John Hanes – mix engineering
 Jeremy Lertola – engineering (1–3, 11, 14, 15)
 Matt Cohn – engineering (1–3, 6–16)
 Sam Holland – engineering (1–4, 6, 10, 11, 13–16)
 Shin Kamiyama – engineering (1–3, 5, 7–15)
 Michael Ilbert – engineering (8)
 Kevin Peterson – mastering assistance

Charts

Weekly charts

Year-end charts

Certifications

Release history

Footnotes

References

External links
 
 
 
 

2022 albums
Albums produced by Brian Kennedy (record producer)
Albums produced by Bruce Johnston
Albums produced by Calvin Harris
Albums produced by Daniel Lopatin
Albums produced by Max Martin
Albums produced by Oscar Holter
Albums produced by Tommy Brown (record producer)
Albums produced by the Weeknd
Albums recorded at Henson Recording Studios
Albums with cover art by Robert Beatty (artist)
Concept albums
Dance-pop albums by Canadian artists
Republic Records albums
Sequel albums
Synth-pop albums by Canadian artists
The Weeknd albums
Juno Award for Pop Album of the Year albums
Juno Award for Album of the Year albums